Big Cove is an unincorporated community in Madison County, Alabama, United States. It is located roughly seven miles southeast of downtown Huntsville. Big Cove is located close to the quickly-growing Hampton Cove community.

History
The area in the gap between Monte Sano and Keel mountains has been known as Big Cove since the middle 1860s. The name Big Cove was simply derived from a description of the surrounding geography.

Big Cove rests at the foot of Green, Huntsville, and Monte Sano mountains.  It was named by John Clan Grayson, the first white settler and permanent resident of the area.  It is bordered to the south by Owens Cross Roads, Alabama, whose zip code encompasses most of the community known as Big Cove.  The northern area of the community, known by locals as the "upper end" is a part of the Brownsboro, Alabama, zip code, and has largely been annexed into the Huntsville City limits.

It was largely a farming community for many years; however, many of the old farms have been sold out of the families who had owned the land for generations, and subdivisions have begun to grow where soy bean, corn, and cotton, were once major cash crops.

References

Unincorporated communities in Alabama
Unincorporated communities in Madison County, Alabama